Florian Angot (born 7 May 1973) is a French former equestrian. He competed in two events at the 2004 Summer Olympics.

References

External links
 

1973 births
Living people
French male equestrians
Olympic equestrians of France
Equestrians at the 2004 Summer Olympics
People from Saint-Lô
Sportspeople from Manche